Cantigny is a commune in the Somme department in Hauts-de-France in northern France.

History 
During World War I, a battle liberated the town from German forces. Major General Robert Lee Bullard commanded the US First Division in the United States' first victory of the war. About 10 years later, Colonel Robert R. McCormick named his estate in Illinois after the town.

Geography 

Population

See also 
 Communes of the Somme department

References

External links 

 Battle of Cantigny at the American Expeditionary Force website

Communes of Somme (department)